East Carrizo Creek rises in Las Animas County, Colorado north of Mt. Carrizo and east of Kim, Colorado, and flows generally southeast before turning south.  It joins with West Carrizo Creek at a point about 6 miles north of the Preston Monument to form North Carrizo Creek.  North Carrizo Creek then flows generally south-southeast into Oklahoma to join the Cimarron River northeast of Kenton, Oklahoma.

East Carrizo Creek flows through Carrizo Canyon, a small canyon located within the Comanche National Grassland that is dotted with juniper and cottonwood trees, and along which American Indian petroglyphs can be found.  The location includes a hiking trail and a picnic area.

See also
West Carrizo Creek
South Carrizo Creek
Carrizo Creek (New Mexico/Texas)
Carrizo Creek (Arizona)

References

Rivers of Colorado
Rivers of Las Animas County, Colorado
Rivers of Baca County, Colorado